Mangi Khurd is a village of Rajura Taluka Chandrapur District Maharashtra and under Gram panchayat Mangi Bk in Chandrapur District  Maharashtra, India

Population 
As of a 2011 Census, the village has 200 families and a population of 848. Of these, 437 are male while the females number 411. There are 63 children aged 0–6 years in this village. Of these, 30 are boys and 33 are girls.

Development 
Mangi Khurd is a smart village under Gram panchayat Mangi Bk. Received a prize of Rs 11 lakh as a smart village. Sant Gage Baba cleanliness award received a prize of Rs. 8 lakh.

Awards 

 Smart Village Award
 Sant Gage Baba Cleanliness Award
 R.R Patil Smart Gram Village Award

Transport

Road 
Gadchandur town is well connected to nearby villages by village roads.

Rail 
Ballarpur is nearest railway station to village.

Air 
Nagpur Airport is the nearest airport to village.

Schools 

 Z.P Primary High School Mangi Kh
 Government Post Bacis Ashram School Mangi Kh

See also 
 List of village in Rajura taluka
 Rajura taluka
 Chandrapur district

References

External links 

Villages in Chandrapur district